Futureproof is the debut album released in 1998 by New Zealand electronica duo, Pitch Black.

Track listing
Disc One
"The Gatherer" – 6:37
"Speech" – 8:40
"They Are Among Us" – 9:32
"Soliton" – 11:57
"The Gatherer (Live)" – 9:17
"Altered State" – 7:58
"Alternate State" – 6:47

Disc Two
"Melt (Dub Obscura Mix)" – 6:54
"Speech (White Amolitude Mix)" – 5:50
"Soliton (Ton A' Sol Mix)" – 5:57
"Speech (Freedom Of Speech Mix)" – 8:00
"Melt (Mr Babbit Mix)" – 7:30
"Speech (Speechless Mix)" – 9:32

References

 Futureproof on discogs.com

Pitch Black (band) albums
1999 debut albums
Dubtronica albums